The Turkish Women's League of America is an organization for Americans of Turkish origin, who are united in an effort to promote equality and justice for women.

Causes
TWLA organizes cultural and recreational activities to foster better understanding between the people of Turkey, the United States, and other counties, including the new Turkish republics of the former Soviet Union; such as the Kazakhs, Uzbeks, and Kyrgyz people in the U.S. The organisation also defends human and civil rights, operates an Atatürk School, which offers courses in the Turkish language, Folklore, Literature, Music, Dance and History.

See also
 Federation of Turkish American Associations

External links
 
 

Turkey–United States relations
Turkish diaspora organizations
Turkish-American history
Turkish organizations and associations in the United States
Women's organizations based in the United States